Olearia avicenniifolia, known commonly as mountain akeake, is a flowering plant in the family Asteraceae. It is endemic to New Zealand where it is found on the southern coastlines of the South Island and on Stewart Island. It is classified as Not Threatened.

Description

Mountain akeake is a small, bushy shrub or tree that grows up to 6 metres tall and 3 metres wide. It has thin, papery bark and angular branchlets covered in white tomentum. Leaves are oblong-lanceolate in shape. They are dark green in colour with a downy, white underside. Leaf length varies between 5–10 cm long and 3–5 cm wide.

Flowers are clustered and daisy-like with white rays and purple central disks. They emerge between November and February and have a sweet scent. Flowers are about 5 centimetres wide and carried in clusters of three to ten. The flowers develop into fluffy seeds.

Taxonomy
It was first described in 1946 by Raoul as Shawia avicenniifolia and transferred to the Olearia genus by Joseph Hooker in 1864.

References

avicenniifolia
Flora of New Zealand